The Mocambo was a nightclub in West Hollywood, California, at 8588 Sunset Boulevard on the Sunset Strip. It was owned by Charlie Morrison and Felix Young.

History
The Mocambo opened on January 3, 1941, and it became an immediate success. The club's Latin American-themed decor was designed by Tony Duquette and cost $100,000. Along the walls were glass cages holding live cockatoos, macaws, seagulls, pigeons, and parrots. With big band music, the club became one of the most popular dance-till-dawn spots in town. On any given night, one might find the room filled with the leading men and women of the motion picture industry. In 1943, when Frank Sinatra became a solo act, he made his Los Angeles debut at the Mocambo.

On March 15, 1955, Ella Fitzgerald opened at the Mocambo, after Marilyn Monroe lobbied the owner for the booking. The booking was instrumental in Fitzgerald's career. The incident was turned into a play by Bonnie Greer in 2005. It has been widely reported that Fitzgerald was the first Black performer to play the Mocambo, following Monroe's intervention, but this is not true. African-American singers Herb Jeffries, Eartha Kitt, and Joyce Bryant all played the Mocambo in 1953, according to stories published at the time in Jet magazine.

Among the many celebrities who frequented the Mocambo were Clark Gable and Carole Lombard, Humphrey Bogart and Lauren Bacall, Errol Flynn, Charlie Chaplin, Elizabeth Taylor, Judy Garland, Henry Fonda, Yma Sumac, Lana Turner, Ava Gardner, Bob Hope, James Cagney, Sophia Loren, Janet Leigh and Tony Curtis, Natalie Wood and Robert Wagner, Grace Kelly, Debbie Reynolds and Eddie Fisher, Howard Hughes, Kay Francis, Marlene Dietrich, Theda Bara, Tyrone Power, Gene Tierney, Jayne Mansfield, John Wayne, Ben Blue, Ann Sothern, and Louis B. Mayer. Myrna Loy and Arthur Hornblow Jr. celebrated their divorce there.

The club's main stage was replicated on the TV series I Love Lucy as the "Tropicana" Club. Lucille Ball and Desi Arnaz were frequent guests at the Mocambo and were close friends of Charlie Morrison.

The Mocambo was also parodied mercilessly in the 1947 Bugs Bunny cartoon, "Slick Hare". According to a commentary track on the DVD with this cartoon, the animators managed to get into the kitchen and drew the kitchen exactly as they saw it, complete with dripping grease on the refrigerator and vegetables lying around the ground.

Early in 1957, club operator and co-owner Charlie Morrison died at his Beverly Hills, California, home. The Mocambo remained in business for one final year, before closing its doors on June 30, 1958. The building was then sold, reopened as a supper club called The Cloister, and eventually demolished.

Notable performers

Abbott and Costello
Edie Adams
Desi Arnaz
Pearl Bailey
Jack Benny
Joyce Bryant
Marge and Gower Champion
Jeff Chandler
Rosemary Clooney
Nat King Cole
Perry Como
Vic Damone
Dorothy Dandridge
Billy Daniels
Sammy Davis Jr.
Gloria DeHaven
Billy Eckstine
Ella Fitzgerald
Firehouse Five Plus Two
Paul Gilbert
Bob Hope
Lena Horne
Herb Jeffries
Allan Jones
Louis Jordan
Will Jordan
Danny Kaye
Alan King
Peggy King
Lisa Kirk
Eartha Kitt
Peter Lawford
Peggy Lee
Joe E. Lewis
Liberace
Gordon MacRae
Martin and Lewis
Marilyn Maxwell
Tim Moore
Mae Murray
Mike Nichols and Elaine May
Amália Rodrigues
Édith Piaf
André Previn
Louis Prima and Keely Smith
The Ritz Brothers
Hazel Scott
Dinah Shore
Frank Sinatra
Yma Sumac
Danny Thomas
Kay Thompson and The Williams Brothers
Gene Tierney
Monique van Vooren
Dinah Washington
Joe Williams
Julie Wilson
Marie Wilson
Xavier Cugat

References

Defunct organizations based in Hollywood, Los Angeles
Nightclubs in Los Angeles County, California
Former music venues in California
Music venues completed in 1941